Louis-Bernard Guyton, Baron de Morveau (also Louis-Bernard Guyton-Morveau after the French Revolution; 4 January 1737 – 2 January 1816) was a French chemist, politician, and aeronaut. He is credited with producing the first systematic method of chemical nomenclature.

Early career
Guyton de Morveau was born in Dijon, where he served as a lawyer, then avocat général, of the Dijon parlement.

In 1773, already interested in chemistry, he proposed use of "muriatic acid gas" for fumigation of buildings and as a result is sometimes given credit for having suggested chlorine in this use. However, chlorine was not well characterized at that time, and hydrogen chloride (made by reacting sodium chloride and sulfuric acid) was actually the active gaseous fumigation agent.

He was criticized by Jean Pierre Chardenon who told him that he should rest in his literary achievements and stay way from chemistry. This challenge led to his resigning his post in 1782 to dedicate himself to chemistry, collaborating on the Encyclopédie Méthodique and working for industrial applications. He performed various useful services in this role, and founded La Société des Mines et Verreries in Saint-Bérain-sur-Dheune. He developed the first system of chemical nomenclature.

In 1783, he was elected a foreign member of the Royal Swedish Academy of Sciences and in 1788 a Fellow of the Royal Society.

Revolution
During the Revolution, Guyton de Morveau (then styled Guyton-Morveau) served as Procureur général syndic of the Côte-d'Or département in 1790, was elected a deputy to the Legislative Assembly in 1792, and then to the National Convention.

Although a member of the right wing, he voted in favor of the execution of King Louis XVI. Guyton de Morveau served on the Committee of Public Safety from 6 April 1793 to 10 July 1793, when he resigned in order to devote his time to the manufacture of firearms, and formation of a corps of balloonists for the French Revolutionary Army. He himself flew in a balloon during the battle of Fleurus on 26 June 1794, and assisted in several other battles.

Later life
He was among the founders of the École polytechnique and the École de Mars, and was a professor of mineralogy at the Polytechnique (as well as its director in 1797). He became a first-class member of the Académie des sciences in chemistry, on 20 November 1795, and subsequently elected vice-president of the class (1806) and then president (1807). In 1798 he married Claudine Picardet, a recently widowed friend and colleague. Under the Directory, he served on the Council of Five Hundred from 1797, elected from Ille-et-Vilaine, and was Treasury administrator of the Consulate in 1799.

Works
Besides being a diligent contributor to the scientific periodicals of the day, Guyton wrote Mémoire sur l’éducation publique (1762); a satirical poem entitled Le Rat iconoclaste, ou le Jésuite croqué (1763); Discours publics et éloges (1775–1782); Plaidoyers sur plusieurs questions de droit (1785); and Traité des moyens de désinfecter l’air (1801), describing the disinfecting powers of chlorine, and of hydrochloric acid gas which he had successfully used at Dijon in 1773. With Hugues Maret (1726–1785) and Jean François Durande (d. 1794) he also published the Élémens de chymie théorique et pratique (1776–1777).

Awards and honors
During his lifetime, Guyton de Morveau received the cross of the Legion of Honour (1803) and was made an Officer of the Legion of Honour for service to humanity (1805).  He was made a baron of the First French Empire in 1811.

Louis Bernard Guyton de Morveau's 1788 publication entitled Méthode de Nomenclature Chimique, published with colleagues Antoine Lavoisier, Claude Louis Berthollet, and Antoine François, comte de Fourcroy, was honored by a Citation for Chemical Breakthrough Award from the Division of History of Chemistry of the American Chemical Society, presented at the Académie des Sciences (Paris) in 2015.

Guyton de Morveau died in Paris on 2 January 1816.

References

1737 births
1816 deaths
Scientists from Dijon
Deputies to the French National Convention
19th-century French chemists
18th-century French lawyers
Barons Guyton-Morveau
Members of the French Academy of Sciences
Members of the Royal Swedish Academy of Sciences
People on the Committee of Public Safety
Regicides of Louis XVI
Fellows of the Royal Society
18th-century French chemists
Politicians from Dijon